Willie Philp was a Scottish professional football centre forward who played in the Scottish League for Cowdenbeath. Either side of his spell with Cowdenbeath, he played in the United States.

Career statistics

Honours 
Cowdenbeath

 Scottish League Second Division (2): 1913–14, 1914–15

Individual

Cowdenbeath Hall of Fame

References 

Scottish footballers
Cowdenbeath F.C. players
Scottish Football League players
Year of birth missing
Place of birth missing
Year of death missing
Association football wing halves
Association football forwards
American Soccer League (1921–1933) players
New York Field Club players
New York Giants (soccer) players
Scottish expatriate footballers
Scottish expatriate sportspeople in the United States
Expatriate soccer players in the United States